Spencer Michael Rattler (born September 28, 2000) is an American football quarterback who plays college football for South Carolina. Rattler began his college career with Oklahoma before transferring to South Carolina in 2021.

High school career
Rattler attended Pinnacle High School in Phoenix, Arizona, for all of his four years of high school. He broke the Arizona high school passing record on his 18th birthday. Rattler threw for 11,083 yards in his four years with 116 passing TDs and rushed for 1,040 yards with 14 rushing TDs. Early in his senior season, he was named MVP of the Elite 11 at The Opening in Texas.

In his final season at Pinnacle, Rattler starred in a Peter Berg-directed Netflix sports documentary series called QB1: Beyond the Lights. Rattler was later suspended for violating a district code of conduct, and was ineligible to play for the rest of the season due to cheating. He initially said he had a sprained MCL, but the school administration later advised him not to speak of the nature of the code of conduct violation.

By the end of his sophomore year in high school, he had received 14 offers from NCAA D-I schools, including Alabama, Notre Dame, and Miami. On June 19, 2017, he visited Oklahoma on an unofficial visit and committed to Oklahoma a week later. On December 19, 2018, he signed his letter of intent to play for coach Lincoln Riley and the Sooners. He was considered a 5 star quarterback by 247Sports and Rivals.com, and a 4 star by ESPN. Rattler was also considered the consensus #1 quarterback in the 2019 recruiting class.

College career

Oklahoma

2019
On June 12, 2019, Rattler enrolled at Oklahoma. He saw action in the second half of the College Football Playoff Semi-Final Game against LSU. Overall, he appeared in a total of three games in the 2019 season, and thus was able to redshirt his freshman year of college.

2020
Going into his redshirt freshman season, Rattler competed with Tanner Mordecai for the starting job. On September 1, Lincoln Riley announced that Rattler had won the starting quarterback job over Mordecai, and Rattler made his starting debut on September 12 against Missouri State. On September 26, Rattler tied the Oklahoma record for most touchdown passes through two weeks with 8, set by Sam Bradford in 2008. However, Rattler's starting job got off to a rocky start when he and his Sooners were upset by Kansas State in his second start. In his third start, Rattler threw for 300 yards and 2 touchdowns in the upset loss at Iowa State. This loss snapped a streak of 24 straight home losses by Iowa State to Oklahoma. Rattler and the Sooners made a comeback with the win against Texas in the Red River Rivalry game. With the 4-overtime win, Rattler became the 3rd OU quarterback to beat Tom Herman. On November 7, Rattler injured his hip in a win against Kansas. As the starting quarterback, he led the Oklahoma Sooners to a 6th consecutive Big 12 Championship, winning 27–21 over Iowa State.

2021
Going into the 2021 season, Rattler was the favorite to win the Heisman Trophy. However, during Oklahoma's match-up against Texas, Rattler was benched during the second quarter for Caleb Williams and would not play the rest of the season. In November 2021, Rattler's personal coach, Mike Giovando, announced that he would be leaving Oklahoma.

South Carolina
In December 2021, Rattler announced he would be transferring to the University of South Carolina to play for the South Carolina Gamecocks, under head coach Shane Beamer. Rattler and Beamer had a connection from their time together at Oklahoma.

2022 
As the starting quarterback for South Carolina in 2022, Rattler led his team to an 8–5 record. He threw 3,012 passing yards and scored 18 touchdowns but also threw 12 interceptions. At the end of the regular season, he led the Gamecocks in two massive upsets. He threw 438 passing yards and six touchdowns in a win over No. 5 Tennessee, breaking the program record for most touchdown passes in a game. The following week, he played for 360 yards and two touchdowns in a win over No. 8 Clemson, South Carolina's archrival, becoming the first South Carolina starting quarterback to beat Clemson since Connor Shaw in 2013. With these wins, Rattler became the first South Carolina quarterback to ever win back-to-back games against top 10 teams. South Carolina then reached its highest CFP ranking ever and its highest AP ranking since 2014, at No. 19 and No. 20, respectively.

In the 2022 Gator Bowl, Rattler and the Gamecocks lost to No. 21 Notre Dame, 38–45, finishing the season 8–5 and ranked No. 23, the program's first finish in the AP Poll since 2013.

On January 10, 2023, Rattler announced he would return to South Carolina for 2023.

Statistics

References

External links

South Carolina Gamecocks bio
Oklahoma Sooners bio

2000 births
Living people
American football quarterbacks
Oklahoma Sooners football players
Players of American football from Phoenix, Arizona
South Carolina Gamecocks football players